I Am a Fugitive (Spanish: Soy un prófugo) is a 1946 Mexican comedy film directed by Miguel M. Delgado and starring Cantinflas, Emilia Guiú and Daniel "Chino" Herrera. The film's sets were designed by Manuel Fontanals.

Plot
A janitor in a large bank is accused of pulling of a major heist. He is forced to become a fugitive while hunting for the real culprits.

Cast

References

Bibliography 
 Pilcher, Jeffrey M. Cantinflas and the Chaos of Mexican Modernity. Rowman & Littlefield, 2001.

External links 
 

1946 films
1946 comedy films
Mexican comedy films
1940s Spanish-language films
Films directed by Miguel M. Delgado
Mexican black-and-white films
1940s Mexican films